The Federation of Education (FE) is a trade union representing workers in the education sector in Spain.

The union was established in 1978, and affiliated to the Workers' Commissions.  In 1981, it had only 2,680 members, but by 1995, membership had grown to 42,340.

General Secretaries
1978: Javier Doz Orrit
1989: Fernando Lezcano
2004: José Campos
2013: Francísco García

References

External links

Education trade unions
Trade unions established in 1978
Trade unions in Spain